"Something Is Squeezing My Skull" is a song with lyrics by Morrissey and music by Alain Whyte. The song is the second single to be released from Morrissey's 2009 album Years of Refusal.  It was recorded in Los Angeles and produced by Jerry Finn, the man behind 2004’s You Are the Quarry. The single was released on 27 April 2009 and reached number 46 on the UK Singles Chart, as well as number one on the Scottish Singles Chart, which at that point still only counted physical sales, becoming Morrissey's third and most recent number-one single on that chart. The song also experienced some success in France, where it reached number 35 on the SNEP chart.

The single comes backed with live recordings of "This Charming Man", "Best Friend on the Payroll" and "I Keep Mine Hidden", the latter being performed for the first time ever by Morrissey and his band at BBC Radio 2's 'Live With Morrissey' concert in February 2009.

The album art depicts Morrissey hugging  Johnny Ramone's memorial statue at his grave in Hollywood Forever Cemetery.

Track listing
CD1
 "Something Is Squeezing My Skull"
 "This Charming Man" (Live, BBC Radio Theatre Feb 2009) (Morrissey/Johnny Marr)

CD2
 "Something Is Squeezing My Skull"
 "Best Friend on the Payroll" (Live, BBC Radio Theatre Feb 2009) (Morrissey/Whyte)

7" single
 "Something Is Squeezing My Skull"
 "I Keep Mine Hidden" (Live, BBC Radio Theatre Feb 2009) (Morrissey/Marr)

Personnel
 Morrissey – vocals
 Boz Boorer – guitar
 Jesse Tobias – guitar
 Solomon Walker – bass guitar
 Matt Walker – drums
 Roger Manning – keyboard
 Kristopher Pooley – keyboard (B-sides only)

Charts

References

2009 singles
Morrissey songs
Songs written by Morrissey
Songs written by Alain Whyte
Decca Records singles
Number-one singles in Scotland